Alpha Island, also known as Isla Huidobro, is a small island lying between Epsilon Island and Delta Island in the Melchior Islands, Palmer Archipelago. Charted by Discovery Investigations in 1927 and named after the first letter of the Greek alphabet, in association with the names of other islands in this group. The island was surveyed by Argentine expeditions in 1942, 1943 and 1948.

See also 
 Composite Antarctic Gazetteer
 List of Antarctic islands south of 60° S
 Scientific Committee on Antarctic Research
 Territorial claims in Antarctica

References

External links 
 Alpha Island on USGS website
 Alpha Island on AADC website
 Alpha Island on SCAR website

Islands of the Palmer Archipelago